The Battle of Cassel was fought in February 1071 between Robert I of Flanders (or Robert the Frisian) and his nephew, Arnulf III (son of Baldwin VI of Flanders). The battle was a victory for Robert, and Arnulf was killed in the battle.

Arnulf succeeded his father Baldwin in 1070 and was supported by his mother Richilde, Countess of Mons and Hainaut. However, Robert challenged Arnulf's succession to the throne of Flanders and began rallying support mainly in northern Flanders (where the bulk of Arnulf's forces were located). Arnulf's ranks contained individuals such as Count Eustace II of Boulogne and Count Eustace III of Boulogne. Moreover, Arnulf was supported by King Philip I of France since Philip's aunt, Adela, married Baldwin V of Flanders. A contingent of ten Norman knights led by William FitzOsbern were among the forces sent by Philip to aid Arnulf.

Robert's forces attacked Arnulf's numerically superior army before it could organize. Arnulf himself was killed along with William FitzOsbern, while Richilde was captured by Robert's forces. However, Robert himself was also captured by Eustace II. Ultimately, Richilde was exchanged for Robert's freedom.

Robert became count of Flanders and ruled until 1093. He gained the friendship of King Philip by offering him the hand in marriage of his stepdaughter, Bertha of Holland.

Notes

References

Sources

Battles involving Flanders
Battles involving France
Battles in Hauts-de-France
1070s in France
Conflicts in 1071
1071 in Europe
History of Nord (French department)
11th century in the county of Flanders
Wars of succession involving the states and peoples of Europe